Kinslayer may refer to:

 a person who commits parricide
 an epithet for Kenneth II of Scotland, in the Prophecy of Berchán
 Lews Therin Telamon, a character in Robert Jordan's Wheel of Time novels who killed his entire family
 Fëanor, a major character in J.R.R. Tolkien's Silmarillion, who led the first slaying of Elves by Elves.
 The Kinslayer Wars, an event in the Dragonlance series of novels, leading to the division between the Silvanesti and the Qualinesti elves
 "The Kinslayer", a song by Nightwish from their album Wishmaster
 Kinslayer is a term given to various characters in A Song of Ice and Fire, both within the story, such as Theon Greyjoy who is believed to have murdered two of his foster-brothers Bran Stark and Rickon Stark, and historical, Jonos Arryn, who murdered his brother Ronnel Arryn, a series of epic fantasy novels by the American novelist and screenwriter George R. R. Martin
 Kinslayer is a name of the book in Gotrek and Felix, series from Warhammer fantasy world